is a passenger railway station located in the town of Shimanto, Takaoka District, Kōchi, Japan. It is operated by Shikoku Railway Company (JR Shikoku). It has the station number "G28".

Lines
The station is served by JR Shikoku's Yodo Line, and is 5.8 kilometers from the starting point of the line at Wakai Station.

Layout
Iejigawa Station, which is unmanned, is on an embankment and consists of a side platform serving a single track. There is no station building, only a shelter for waiting passengers. An access road leads to a paved compound at the base of the embankment where car may be parked. Around the compound there is a toilet building, a bike shed and a public telephone call box. A flight of steps leads up from the compound to the platform. The station is not wheelchair accessible.

Adjacent stations

|-
!colspan=5|JR Shikoku

History
The station opened on 1 March 1974 under the control of Japanese National Railways. After the privatization of JNR on 1 April 1987, control of the station passed to JR Shikoku.

Surrounding area
Iejigawa Dam (家地川ダム) - a weir across the Shimanto River.  
Iejigawa Park (家地川公園) - a local park on both sides of the Shimanto River with some 300 cherry trees.

See also
 List of railway stations in Japan

References

External links
Station timetable

Railway stations in Kōchi Prefecture
Yodo Line
Railway stations in Japan opened in 1974
Shimanto, Kōchi (town)